The Chinese thrush (Turdus mupinensis) is a species of bird in the family Turdidae. It is found in China and far northern Vietnam. Its natural habitats are temperate forests and subtropical or tropical moist montane forests.

A recent molecular study places the Chinese thrush's closest relatives as the similarly plumaged European species, the song thrush (T. philomelos) and the mistle thrush (T. viscivorus), all three species early offshoots from the main Turdus radiation around the world.

References

External links

 BirdLife Especies, ficha técnica. (en inglés)

Chinese thrush
Chinese thrush
Birds of China
Chinese thrush
Taxonomy articles created by Polbot
Taxobox binomials not recognized by IUCN